The II Caucasian Corps of the Ottoman Empire (Turkish: 2 nci Kafkas Kolordusu or İkinci Kafkas Kolordusu) was one of the corps of the Ottoman Army. It was formed during World War I.

Formations

Order of Battle, December 1916, August 1917, January 1918 
In December 1916, August 1917, January 1918, the corps was structured as follows:

II Caucasian Corps (Caucasus)
5th Caucasian Division, 11th Caucasian Division, 37th Caucasian Division

Sources

Corps of the Ottoman Empire
Military units and formations of the Ottoman Empire in World War I
1916 establishments in the Ottoman Empire